George A. Kyle (6 November 1908 – 1998) was a Scottish footballer who made over 110 appearances in the Scottish League for East Stirlingshire as a goalkeeper. He also played league football for Dunfermline Athletic and Cowdenbeath and also in Wales for Bangor City.

Personal life 
Kyle was the grandfather of footballer Ray Allan. As a territorial, after the outbreak of the Second World War in 1939, Kyle was called into the Fife and Forfar Yeomanry. He went to France as part of the BEF in January 1940 and was later evacuated from Dunkirk. Kyle rose to the rank of sergeant major and after the war he became an amateur entertainer in Fife. He was named Cowdenbeath's "Citizen of the Year" in 1983.

Career statistics

References 

Scottish footballers
Cowdenbeath F.C. players
Scottish Football League players

1908 births
1998 deaths
Footballers from Dunfermline
Association football goalkeepers
East Stirlingshire F.C. players
Dunfermline Athletic F.C. players
Bangor City F.C. players
British Army personnel of World War II
Fife and Forfar Yeomanry officers